The 2004 Australian Nations Cup Championship was an Australian motor racing competition for modified production-based coupes complying with "Nations Cup" regulations. Contested as part of the 2004 Procar Championship Series, it was sanctioned by the Confederation of Australian Motor Sport as a National Championship with PROCAR Australia Pty Ltd appointed as the Category Manager.

The championship, which was the fifth Australian Nations Cup Championship, was won by defending champion Paul Stokell driving a Lamborghini Diablo GTR. Finishing second was Nathan Pretty driving a Holden Monaro 427C with David Stevens third in his turbocharged Porsche 911 GT2.

The 2004 championship was eagerly awaited by fans of the category. Although it had lost John Bowe and his Ferrari 360 N-GT, popular young Danish driver Allan Simonsen would drive an ex-ALMS Ferrari 550 GT2 in selected rounds (as well as racing a Ferrari 360 Challenge in the Trophy Class) for Mark Coffey Racing while David Stevens introduced the 911 GT2. 59 year old Australian racing legend Peter Brock, after racing a Monaro for Garry Rogers Motorsport in 2003, left to form his own team (with Monaro's supplied by GRM) with himself and oldest son James Brock doing the driving. GRM themselves would continue with Pretty driving the #427 Monaro as well as servicing the Team Brock cars between rounds. Ian Palmer, the brother of series founder Ross Palmer, raced a Honda NSX Brabham and also Peter Brock's Monaro for a number of races. Team Lamborghini Australia returned to defend their crown with Stokell driving the V12 Lamborghini Diablo and he was joined by Formula 3 driver Peter Hackett in a second Diablo GTR.

Following the 2004 championship, PROCAR shut down the Nations Cup championship citing financial difficulties (this also saw the cancellation of the 2004 Bathurst 24 Hour). From 2005 CAMS would revive the Australian GT Championship with the Nations Cup cars (with the exception of the Monaros) eligible to race in that series.

Schedule
The championship was contested over a seven round series with three races per round.

Classes
Cars competing in two classes, GT Class and Trophy Class, classified according to potential vehicle performance.

Points system
Championship points were awarded in each class on a 30-24-20-18-17-16-15-14-13-12-11-10-9-8-7-6-5-4-3-2-1 basis to the top twenty one class placegetters in each race. 3 bonus points were awarded to the driver achieving pole position in each class during qualifying at each round.

Cars from a separate series, the Porsche Drivers Challenge, were invited to compete with the Nations Cup cars at selected rounds however the drivers were not eligible for championship points.

Championship results

References

External links
Stokell, Hemmes, Alajajian & White Crowned Procar Champions At Mallala, www.procar.com.au, as archived at web.archive.org
Wakefield Park Race Results - 8 August 2004 Retrieved from web.archive.org on 7 May 2009
Images from the early rounds of the 2004 ANCC Retrieved from web.archive.org on 7 May 2009

Australian Nations Cup Championship
Nations Cup Championship